The 5th National Geographic Bee was held in Washington, D.C. on May 26, 1993, sponsored by the National Geographic Society. The final competition was moderated by Jeopardy! host Alex Trebek. The winner was Noel Erinjeri of Swartz Creek, Michigan, who won a $25,000 college scholarship. The 2nd-place winner, Michael Ring of Milford, Massachusetts, won a $15,000 scholarship. The 3rd-place winner, Jeffrey Hoppes of Lancaster, Pennsylvania, won a $10,000 scholarship.

References

External links
 National Geographic Bee Official Website

National Geographic Bee